Reginald Pole Blundell (4 February 1871 – 9 August 1945) was a member of the South Australian House of Assembly from 1907 to 1918 and the Australian House of Representatives from 1919 to 1922.

Blundell was born in the Adelaide suburb of Norwood and educated at Norwood Public School.  He married Alice Clara Gates in 1894.  He joined the  Tobacco Twisters' Union and was its secretary for eight years.  He became secretary of the United Trades and Labour Council of South Australia and was its president in 1905.

He was a Senate candidate in the 1906 federal election in South Australia, finishing a close 5th, missing out by less than 200 votes. Blundell successfully challenged the election, with the High Court in June 1907 declaring that the election of the third choice Senator Joseph Vardon was void.

Blundell did not personally benefit from that success as he had subsequently been successful at a by-election in January 1907 to the House of Assembly as one of four members for the seat of Adelaide, representing the United Labor Party. At the 1915 election in Crawford Vaughan's Labor government he became minister of industry, mines and marine.

In 1917, he left the Labor Party in the 1917 Labor split over conscription and joined the National Party. He was minister for repatriation, agriculture and industry in Archibald Peake's government until his defeat at the 1918 election.  At the 1919 federal election, he was elected as a Nationalist to the federal seat of Adelaide, but was defeated at the 1922 election.

Blundell returned to work for W.D. & H.O. Wills as a commercial traveller.  He died of pernicious anaemia in the Adelaide suburb of Glenelg survived by his wife, three daughters and three sons.

Notes

Nationalist Party of Australia members of the Parliament of Australia
Members of the South Australian House of Assembly
Members of the Australian House of Representatives for Adelaide
Members of the Australian House of Representatives
Australian trade unionists
1871 births
1945 deaths
Deaths from pernicious anemia
Australian Labor Party members of the Parliament of South Australia
20th-century Australian politicians